Benavente Municipality may refer to:

Benavente, Portugal
Benavente, Zamora, Spain